The V Due was a 500cc V-twin two-stroke motorcycle first manufactured by Bimota in 1997. Technical specs included the first electronically controlled direct fuel injection on a two-stroke bike, cassette type gearbox and dry clutch. Its power-to-weight ratio surpassed almost all sports bikes of the day. The first production run of 150 bikes suffered from major problems including oil leaks, seized pistons and intermittent power delivery. Many new owners simply returned their bikes at this point. In 1999 Bimota managed to fix most of the initial faults and made 26 units, all however were not road legal. In 2001 Bimota gave up with its problematic electronic fuel injection and fitted carburetors, first producing the non-road legal "Evoluzione Corsa" model of which only 14 were produced and finally the road legal "Evoluzione" model of which 120 were produced and sold. Today, due to its rarity, most V Dues are in the hand of collectors.

See also 

Aprilia RSW-2 500

External links
 https://web.archive.org/web/20080302021421/http://www.vdue.it/eng/intro.htm
 http://www.odd-bike.com/2012/11/bimota-v-due-500-bike-that-killed-bimota.html

V Due
Sport bikes
Motorcycles introduced in 1997
Two-stroke motorcycles